The FF-1080 is an aircraft design by Utilicraft Aerospace Industries of Albuquerque, New Mexico, USA, for a twin turboprop aircraft fitted to carry LD3 aircraft cargo containers between large airports and smaller airports.

American Utilicraft, the predecessor of Utilicraft Aerospace Industries, patented the design for the FF-1080 in 1991. Prototype engineering began in 2000 at Aircraft Design Services Incorporated in San Antonio, Texas. A company called Micro Craft was chosen to build the prototype, with plans to build subassemblies at a factory in Huntsville, Alabama, and to assemble the prototype at Gwinnett Airport in Atlanta.

American Utilicraft entered a memorandum of understanding with the San Juan Pueblo (now known as the Ohkay Owingeh Pueblo) to build a production aircraft assembly plant in northern New Mexico. The Ohkay Owingeh Indian pueblo is the owner of Ohkay Owingeh Airport. State officials encouraged the companies and the pueblo to seek state loans to begin production of the aircraft.

Variants
FF-1080 Freight Feeder base-line freighter, planned and designed from the early 1990s; not built.
FF-1080-100 short fuselage version for 4 LD3 containers, powered by 2 Pratt & Whitney Canada PW121 turboprop engines; not built.
FF-1080-200 initial standard version, 2 Pratt & Whitney Canada PW122, 6 LD3 containers; not built.
FF-1080-300ER base-line version from December 2004, carrying up to 10 LD3 or 5 A-1 containers; not built.
FF-1080-500 enlarged version, re-designated FF5000; not built.
FF4000 proposed shrink for 4 M-1 containers /  payload; not built.
FF5000 standard version from 2008, 6 M-1 containers, renamed FF5000; not built.

Specifications (FF5000)

References

External links
Market News First investor report

Abandoned civil aircraft projects of the United States